The 1993 IBM OS/2 Fiesta Bowl, played on January 1, 1993, was the 22nd edition of the Fiesta Bowl. The game featured the Colorado Buffaloes and the Syracuse Orangemen.

Game summary

1st half
Syracuse opened up a 6–0 lead following field goals of 46 and 34 yards from John Biskup. In the second quarter, quarterback Kordell Stewart threw a 7-yard touchdown pass to Sean Embree to give Colorado a 7–6 lead. That would close out the first half scoring.

2nd half
With 6:22 left in the third quarter, tailback David Walker scored on a 13-yard touchdown run. Up 12–7, Syracuse opted for two, but failed, leaving the score at 12–7, Syracuse. Colorado's Mitch Berger connected on a 38-yard field goal with 3:10 left in the quarter, to cut the lead to 12–10.

Facing a third and 10 on Colorado's 28-yard line, Marvin Graves took it himself, and ran 28 yards for a touchdown, increasing Syracuse's lead to 19–10 with 1:33 in the quarter. Colorado running back James Hill ran for 61 yards a few plays later, to set up a 16-yard slant pass from Stewart to Charles Johnson. The all-important extra point was missed, and Syracuse held on to a 19–16 lead.

On the ensuing kickoff, Kirby Dar Dar took a reverse handoff from Qadry Ismail and scored on a dazzling 100 yard kickoff return, increasing the lead to 26–16. Following a 6-yard touchdown run, Colorado pulled to within 26–22, but the extra point missed. The kicking game decided the outcome of the game.

References

External links
 https://query.nytimes.com/gst/fullpage.html?res=9F0CE2DD143BF931A35752C0A965958260&scp=14&sq=Fiesta+Bowl&st=nyt

Fiesta Bowl
Fiesta Bowl
Colorado Buffaloes football bowl games
Syracuse Orange football bowl games
Bowl Coalition
Fiesta Bowl
January 1993 sports events in the United States